Carey McWilliams (December 13, 1905 – June 27, 1980) was an American author, editor, and lawyer. He is best known for his writings about California politics and culture, including the condition of migrant farm workers and the internment of Japanese Americans during World War II. From 1955 to 1975, he edited The Nation magazine.

Early years
McWilliams was born December 13, 1905 in Steamboat Springs, Colorado. He first came to California in 1922, after a collapse in the cattle market ruined his father's health and his family's finances.

McWilliams attended the University of Southern California from which he obtained a law degree in 1927.

From 1927 to 1938, McWilliams practiced law in Los Angeles at Black, Hammock & Black. Some of his cases, including his defense of striking Mexican citrus workers, prefigured his later writing.

During the 1920s and early 1930s, McWilliams joined a loose network of mostly Southern California writers that included Robinson Jeffers, John Fante, Louis Adamic, and Upton Sinclair. His literary career also benefited greatly from his relationships with Mary Austin and H.L. Mencken. Mencken provided an outlet for McWilliams's early journalism and floated the idea for his first book, a 1929 biography of popular writer and sometime Californian Ambrose Bierce.

Political activity
The Depression and the rise of European fascism in the 1930s radicalized McWilliams. He began working with left-wing political and legal organizations, including the American Civil Liberties Union and the National Lawyers Guild. He also wrote for Pacific Weekly, Controversy, The Nation, and other progressive magazines. He continued to represent workers in and around Los Angeles, helped organize unions and guilds, and served as a trial examiner for the new National Labor Relations Board.

His first bestseller, Factories in the Field, appeared in 1939 and ranks among his most enduring works. Published within months of John Steinbeck's The Grapes of Wrath, it examines the lives of migrant farm workers in California and condemns the politics and consequences of California agricultural land monopoly and large-scale agribusiness. Shortly before its publication, McWilliams accepted an offer from incoming Governor Culbert Olson to head California's Division of Immigration and Housing. Over his four-year term (1938-1942), he focused on improving agricultural working conditions and wages, but his hopes for major reform deteriorated with the advent of World War II.

During the 1940s, McWilliams lived in Echo Park, California, a neighborhood of Los Angeles. He owned his home at 2041 Alvarado Street until the 1970s, well after he moved to New York in 1951.

McWilliams left his government post in 1942, when incoming Governor Earl Warren promised campaign audiences that his first official act would be to fire him. McWilliams was a sharp critic of Warren, whom he described as "the personification of Smart Reaction," but he became an enthusiastic admirer after Warren joined the US Supreme Court the following decade. No such conversion occurred in his attitude toward another California politician, Richard Nixon, whom McWilliams described in 1950 as "a dapper little man with an astonishing capacity for petty malice."

After leaving the state government, McWilliams continued to write prolifically. He turned his attention to issues of racial and ethnic equality, writing a series of important books (including Brothers Under the Skin, Prejudice, North from Mexico, and A Mask for Privilege) that dealt with the treatment of immigrant and minority groups. He also produced two regional portraits, Southern California Country: An Island on the Land (1946, American Folkways series) and California: The Great Exception (1949), which many aficionados still regard as the finest interpretive histories of those areas. Decades after its publication, Southern California Country inspired Robert Towne's Oscar-winning original screenplay for Chinatown (1974).

Accusations of communist sympathies
Witch Hunt (1950) was an early attempt to combat McCarthyism, which McWilliams considered a grave threat to civil liberties and healthy politics. Although he was never a member of the Communist Party, he was a frequent target of anticommunist attacks. In the 1940s, he was called before the Committee on Un-American Activities in California. FBI director J. Edgar Hoover placed him on the Custodial Detention List, making him a candidate for detention in case of national emergency even though McWilliams was serving in the state government at the time.

His activism took many forms. In the early 1940s, he helped overturn the convictions of mostly Latino youths following the so-called Sleepy Lagoon murder trial. He also helped cool the city's temperature during the Zoot Suit Riots of 1943, when scuffles between servicemen and Latino youths spun out of control.

Once out of government, he became an outspoken critic of the removal and internment of Japanese American citizens and almost immediately began writing an exposé on the topic. Published in 1944, Prejudice: Japanese-Americans: Symbol of Racial Intolerance was cited by Justice Frank Murphy in his dissenting opinion in Korematsu v. United States, the Supreme Court decision that upheld the constitutionality of the exclusion.

Several years later, a group of Los Angeles screenwriters, directors, and producers known as the Hollywood Ten was cited for contempt of Congress after refusing to answer a House committee's questions about Communist Party membership. McWilliams drafted a Supreme Court amicus brief for two of them, John Howard Lawson and Dalton Trumbo. (The Court declined to hear their appeal.)

In 1951, McWilliams moved to New York City to work at The Nation under editor Freda Kirchwey. For the next decade, he helped shepherd the magazine through its most difficult period. Taking over as editor in 1955, he stayed until 1975 and is credited with strengthening the magazine's investigative reporting. He also published the early work of Ralph Nader, Howard Zinn, Theodore Roszak, William Ryan (psychologist) and Hunter S. Thompson. William Ryan credited McWilliams with challenging him to write what became his classic book 'Blaming the victim' (1971). Hunter S. Thompson credited McWilliams with the idea for his first bestselling book, Hell's Angels: A Strange and Terrible Saga (1967).

McWilliams and Bay of Pigs story
McWilliams was the first American reporter to reveal that the CIA was training a group of Cuban exiles in Guatemala for the Bay of Pigs Invasion. His article for The Nation, "Are We Training Cuban Guerrillas?", was published in November 1960, during the Eisenhower Administration, five months before the invasion occurred.

The story was largely ignored by major newspapers like The New York Times and The Washington Post. Arthur M. Schlesinger, Jr., an aide to President John F. Kennedy, pressured The New Republic not to run a story about the guerrilla force. Following the failure of the invasion, Kennedy expressed regret that more information about the invasion plan was not published by telling Times reporter Turner Catledge, "If you had printed more about the operation, you would have saved us from a colossal mistake."

Death and legacy
He died in New York City on June 27, 1980, at 74. Since his death, his critical fortunes have risen steadily. The American Political Science Association gives an annual Carey McWilliams Award "to honor a major journalistic contribution to our understanding of politics." In Embattled Dreams (2002), California historian Kevin Starr calls McWilliams "the single finest nonfiction on California–ever," and biographer Peter Richardson maintains that McWilliams might be the most versatile American public intellectual of the twentieth century.

His first son, Wilson Carey McWilliams, was a noted political scientist who taught at Rutgers University. His second son, Jerry McWilliams, was an expert on vinyl disc records preservation. McWilliams had two grandchildren: Susan McWilliams Barndt, a professor of politics at Pomona College, and Helen McWilliams, the lead singer of VAGIANT Boston.

His papers are housed in the Bancroft Library at the University of California, Berkeley and at Special Collections at the University of California, Los Angeles.

Works
Ambrose Bierce: A Biography (New York: A. & C. Boni, 1929). Revised edition: Archon Books, 1967.
America Is In the Heart, A Personal History, by Carlos Bulosan: Introduction by Carey McWilliams (Seattle: University of Washington Press, 1973; reissue 2014 with addition of New Introduction by Marilyn C. Alquizola and Lane Ryo Hirabayashi)
Brothers Under the Skin: African-Americans and Other Minorities. (Boston: Little, Brown and Company, 1943).
California: The Great Exception (New York: Current Books, 1949).
(Edited by McWilliams) The California Revolution, (New York: Grossman Publishers, 1968).
The Education of Carey McWilliams (New York: Simon and Schuster, 1979).
Factories in the Field: The Story of Migratory Farm Labor in California (Boston: Little, Brown and Company, 1939).
Ill Fares the Land: Migrants and Migratory Labor in the United States (Boston: Little, Brown and Company, 1942).
Louis Adamic and Shadow-America (Los Angeles: A. Whipple, 1935).
A Mask for Privilege: Anti-Semitism in America (Boston: Little, Brown, 1948).
The Mexicans in America: A Students’ Guide to Localized History (New York: Teachers College Press, 1968).
North from Mexico: The Spanish-Speaking People of the US (Philadelphia: Lippincott, 1949).
Politics of Personality: California, The Nation, October 27, 1962.
Prejudice: Japanese-Americans, Symbol of Racial Intolerance (Boston: Little, Brown, 1944).
Race Discrimination – and the Law (New York: National Federation for Constitutional Liberties, 1945).
Small Farm and Big Farm (New York: Public Affairs Committee, 1945).
Southern California Country: An Island on the Land (American Folkways series, New York: Duell, Sloan & Pearce, 1946). Also published as Southern California: An Island on the Land (Santa Barbara: Peregrine Smith, 1973).
What About Our Japanese-Americans? (New York: Public Affairs Committee, 1944).
 Witch Hunt: The Revival of Heresy (Boston: Little, Brown, 1950).

References

Further reading
Corman, Catherine A. "Teaching – and Learning from – Carey McWilliams," California History December 22, 2001.
Critser, Greg. "The Political Rebellion of Carey McWilliams," UCLA Historical Journal 4 (1983: 34–65.
Critser, Greg. "The Making of a Cultural Rebel: Carey McWilliams, 1924–1930," Pacific Historical Review 55 (1986): 226–55.
Davis, Mike. "Optimism of the Will", The Nation, September 19, 2005.
Geary, Daniel. "Carey McWilliams and Antifascism, 1934–1943," Journal of American History Vol. 90, No. 3, December 2003, 912–934.
Peter Richardson. American Prophet: The Life and Work of Carey McWilliams (Ann Arbor, Michigan: University of Michigan Press, 2005; rpt. University of California Press, 2019).
Richardson, Peter.  "Carey McWilliams: The California Years", UCLA Library, May 2005.
Stewart, Dean & Jeannine Gendar (eds.). Fool's Paradise: A Carey McWilliams Reader (Santa Clara, California: Santa Clara University Press, 2001).

External links
 Carey McWilliams Quotes
 Co-written Letters to the Editor of the New York Review of Books entitled The "Excelsior" Affair, Ford's Better Idea, Violence in Oakland, and Protest
 Interview of Carey McWilliams, Center for Oral History Research, UCLA Library Special Collections, University of California, Los Angeles.
 List of winners of the American Political Science Association's Carey McWilliams award
 NewsScan "Honorary Subscriber" Page on McWilliams
 Guide to the Carey McWilliams Papers at The Bancroft Library
 1965 talk at UCLA on the anticipated impact of computers YouTube, Retrieved 30 August 2015

20th-century American non-fiction writers
American political writers
American magazine editors
The Nation editors
American male journalists
20th-century American lawyers
California lawyers
Agricultural labor in the United States
Mexican-American history
USC Gould School of Law alumni
People from Echo Park, Los Angeles
1905 births
1980 deaths
20th-century American male writers